= Trade unions in Cambodia =

International Labour Organization
- Cambodia is a member of the ILO

Trade unions in Cambodia are generally small but have high membership rates in some sectors, with the majority of garment factories reporting over 70 percent of workers being members of a union.
